Nizhny Burgaltay (Doodo Burgaltai) is a rural locality (a selo) in Dzhidinsky District, Republic of Buryatia, Russia. The population was 675 as of 2017. There are 9 streets.

Geography 
Nizhny Burgaltay is located 16 km southwest of Petropavlovka (the district's administrative centre) by road. Verkhny Burgaltay is the nearest rural locality.

References 

Rural localities in Dzhidinsky District